Tumbarinu are Sardinian drums made with dog or donkey skin. They are a characteristic folk instrument of Gavoi.

References

Drums
Italian musical instruments